The FIDE Grand Prix is a biennial series of chess tournaments, organized by FIDE and its commercial partner Agon. Each series consist of three to six chess tournaments, which form part of the qualification cycle for the World Chess Championship or Women's World Chess Championship.

History 
The Grand Prix was first played in 2008. The initial Grand Prix saw Magnus Carlsen withdraw (along with Michael Adams) due to changed incentives toward the World Chess Championship,  (see FIDE Grand Prix 2008–2010 for details).

The first two Grand Prix consisted of six tournaments, but the 2014–2015 edition had only four. Often there were problems finding sponsors and many announced host cities were changed eventually (to date, 8 of the 16 locations have been changed). The 2014–15 edition was announced late, with only 4 events instead of 6, reduced the prizes per event to about 1/3 of the previous amounts, and had no money for overall placings (as in the earlier editions). In 2014–15, four top 10 players (Carlsen, Anand, Topalov and Aronian) didn't participate, with the small prize funds and organizational uncertainty being the usual reasons given.

The winner of the Grand Prix (and sometimes lower finishers) gets entry to the Candidates Tournament. The winner of the women's cycle is directly qualified to a championship match. The women's edition has been dominated by Chinese GM Hou Yifan, though she withdrew from the 2015–16 series.

The format was changed for the FIDE Grand Prix 2017 with 24 players taking part in the cycle. Four events took place with 18 players in competing in each nine-round Swiss tournament. The events were originally announced to take place on Oct. 12 to 23, 2016; Feb. 10 to 21, 2017; May 11 to 22, 2017; and July 5 to 16, 2017. On May 26, 2016, Agon CEO Ilya Merenzon hoped to announce the venues within the next two weeks. After the FIDE meetings at the 42nd Chess Olympiad in Baku in early September 2016, Peter Doggers of Chess.com reported that the Grand Prix has been postponed until 2017. Shakhriyar Mamedyarov and Alexander Grischuk qualified to the 2018 Candidates Tournament.

In 2019, the format has been changed by FIDE once again, making Grand Prix a knock-out series with 21 players taking part in the Series and 16 player in each event. 20 players qualified by rating and 2 are wild cards invited by organizers. The cities were Moscow, Riga, Hamburg and Jerusalem. The Series is organized by World Chess (formerly Agon) and was broadcast on  worldchess.com and via media partners.

The 2022 Grand Prix took place in Berlin, Belgrade, then Berlin again.

Results

Open competitions 
The players who qualify for the Candidates Tournament are marked with green background.

Women's competitions 
Hou Yifan has won all three Grand Prix she has played. Koneru Humpy is the perennial runner-up, coming second in every Grand Prix to date.

The players who qualify for the world women's championship match are marked with blue background.

The players who qualify for the Candidates Tournament are marked with green background.

See also
Chess World Cup

References

External links
Official FIDE site
Official 2019 World Chess Grand Prix Site  

 
Sports competition series